Healing the centurion's servant is one of the miracles performed by Jesus of Nazareth as related in the Gospel of Matthew and the Gospel of Luke (both part of the Christian biblical canon). The story is not recounted in the Gospels of either John or Mark.

According to these accounts, a Roman centurion asks Jesus for his help because his servant is ill. Jesus offers to go to the centurion's house to perform a healing, but the centurion hesitates and suggests that Jesus' word of authority would be sufficient. Impressed, Jesus comments approvingly at the strong religious faith displayed by the soldier (despite not being a Jew) and grants the request, which results in the servant being healed the same day.

Sources

Scriptural sources

The story of the centurion appears both in the Gospel of Matthew and that of Luke:

Origins
The story of the centurion is not mentioned in the Gospel of Mark, the earliest of the four gospels. One theory is that material not in Mark but found in both Matthew and Luke may have come from a lost source known as "Q". If true then this passage would still be an anomaly as Q is believed to have been a collection of sayings of Jesus (a list of sermons and quotations) with no other contextual material; but the story of the centurion does include background detail. It would also be the only miracle story that originated in Q.  One possibility is that only the dialogue was in Q, and both Matthew and Luke added the background details from a shared oral history.

Some modern commentators treat them as the same event. However, in his analysis of Matthew, R. T. France presents linguistic arguments against the equivalence of pais and son and considers these two separate miracles. Merrill C. Tenney in his commentary on John and Orville Daniel in his Gospel harmony also consider them two different incidents.

The basic problem is the difference between the two accounts. Since Luke does not say that the centurion himself came to Christ, but only sent to Him, first Jews, and then his friends. St. John Chrysostom, Theophylact of Ohrid, and Euthymius, all hold that these events in Luke happened first and then last of all the centurion came to Christ. He did this "either for the sake of doing Him honour, or because of the urgency of the disease, and the imminent peril of death." St. Augustine and Bede are of the opinion that the centurion never came to Jesus but only came in the sense of sending his friends as emissaries.

Use in the liturgy

The statements made by the centurion are used in the Prayer of Humble Access contained in many Anglican, Methodist, Presbyterian, and other Christian Eucharist liturgies. His statements are also used as part of the Communion rite in the Roman Rite of the Catholic Church.

Interpretations
According to I. Howard Marshall, there were no Roman forces in Galilee prior to AD 44; therefore, the soldier was probably a member of Herod Agrippa's troops, which modeled Roman organization.  Either way, although his nationality is not given, he is clearly a gentile.

Meaning of "servant"

Meaning of "such faith"
Christ says, "He did not find such faith in all Israel," which according to John McEvilly implies that he was a Pagan soldier, most likely Roman. He further states that this statement must have excluded those who "from the very nature of things, and the well-known evidence of facts, were excepted." This exception would include the Virgin Mary, John the Baptist, the Patriarchs and Prophets of the Old Testament, the Apostles, etc. This is clear when Jesus refers to John the Baptist, saying, “No greater arose among the born of women.” (Matt 11:11) And of course he would have excluded himself.

Gnostic interpretation 
In his Against Heresies, Irenaeus tells us that some Gnostics believed the story to be metaphorical, with the centurion being merely a symbol of the demiurge. According to this interpretation, the demiurge tells Jesus that he has tried all he could to save the servant (humanity) but his laws have not succeeded in healing humanity or offering it a proper means towards spiritual development. Accordingly, the demiurge urges Jesus to say a word (spread gnosis) to offer true salvation to humanity.

Homosexual interpretation 
Daniel A. Helminiak, an American Catholic priest, theologian and author of "What the Bible Really Says about Homosexuality", states that the word , used for the servant, could have a sexual meaning. The Roman military historian D.B. Saddington writes that while he does not exclude the possibility, the evidence the two put forward supports "neither of these interpretations".

See also

 Life of Jesus in the New Testament
 Ministry of Jesus
 Parables of Jesus

References

LGBT and Christianity
Miracles of Jesus
Supernatural healing